Eurysacca quinoae is a moth in the family Gelechiidae. It was described by Povolný in 1997. It is found in Bolivia.

This species is known to attack quinoa (Chenopodium quinoa).

References

Eurysacca
Moths described in 1997